Elmer Konstantin Niklander (19 January 1890 – 12 November 1942) was a Finnish athlete who competed in throwing events. Participating in four Olympic Games, he won the gold medal in the 1920 discus throw and three other medals.

Athletics

Olympic Games 

In 1924, he served as the Olympic flag bearer for Finland.

National 

Niklander won 44 titles at the Finnish Championships in Athletics in throwing events in 1909–1924, a national record in itself. Summary:
 shot put, 7 titles: 1914, 1915, 1916, 1917, 1918, 1920, 1924
 two-handed shot put, 11 titles: 1909, 1910, 1912, 1913, 1914, 1915, 1916, 1917, 1918, 1920, 1924
 discus throw, 5 titles: 1914, 1915, 1916, 1917, 1918
 two-handed discus throw, 11 titles: 1909, 1910, 1911, 1912, 1913, 1914, 1915, 1916, 1917, 1918, 1920
 Greek discus throw, 2 titles: 1912, 1913
 hammer throw, 6 titles: 1911, 1914, 1915, 1916, 1917, 1918
 weight throw, 2 titles: 1914, 1918
He also won 12 silvers and 1 bronze.

Records and bests 

Niklander broke a world record once:
 20 July 1913, two-handed discus throw, 90.13 m. The record still stands.
He also broke two world records unofficially:
 1909, two-handed shot put, 26.89 m
 1910, two-handed discus throw, 87.12 m
Neither result was ratified as a record because the dimensions of the throwing circle weren't up to the international standard.

He broke several Finnish national records:
 25 October 1907, shot put, 13.47 m
 4 July 1909, shot put, 14.68 m
 19 June 1910, discus throw, 44.88 m
 15 August 1910, hammer throw, 40.04 m
 19 July 1913, two-handed shot put, 27.75 m
 7 June 1914, hammer throw, 45.95 m
 1914, weight throw, 10.76 m
 4 July 1915, hammer throw, 47.18 m
 12 June 1916, hammer throw, 47.57 m

Personal bests per event:
 shot put, 14.86 m, 19 July 1913
 two-handed shot put, 27.75 m, 19 July 1913
 discus throw, 47.18 m, 16 July 1916
 two-handed discus throw, 90.13 m, 20 July 1913
 hammer throw, 47.57 m, 12 June 1916
 javelin throw, 54.19 m, 12 June 1916
 weight throw, 10.76 m, 1914

Personal 

Niklander was born in Rutajärvi village in Hausjärvi on 18 January 1890 to father Konstantin Niklander (1848–1903) and mother Henriika née Harjula (1858–1942). His younger brother Siivo (1883–1961) made two Finnish national records in shot put in 1907.

Niklander became an athlete through practice in his home yard and by taking part in athletic competitions arranged by the local fire department.

Before the Finnish Civil War, Niklander joined the Hausjärvi White Guard and took part in the Mommila skirmish in November 1917. For this, the Red Guard sentenced him to death, and once the war began, he had to go into hiding.

Niklander died of stomach cancer on 12 November 1942.

References

1890 births
1942 deaths
People from Hausjärvi
Finnish male discus throwers
Finnish male shot putters
Olympic athletes of Finland
Athletes (track and field) at the 1908 Summer Olympics
Athletes (track and field) at the 1912 Summer Olympics
Athletes (track and field) at the 1920 Summer Olympics
Athletes (track and field) at the 1924 Summer Olympics
Olympic gold medalists for Finland
Olympic silver medalists for Finland
Olympic bronze medalists for Finland
Medalists at the 1920 Summer Olympics
Medalists at the 1912 Summer Olympics
Olympic gold medalists in athletics (track and field)
Olympic silver medalists in athletics (track and field)
Olympic bronze medalists in athletics (track and field)
Olympic weight throwers
Deaths from cancer in Finland
People of the Finnish Civil War (White side)
People sentenced to death in absentia
Deaths from stomach cancer
Sportspeople from Kanta-Häme
19th-century Finnish people
20th-century Finnish people